Virtue is an American gospel music group. The group currently consists of Ebony Holland, Karima Kibble and Heather Martin.

History
Virtue was formed in 1994 by Karima Trotter (Kibble), Ebony Trotter (Holland), Negelle Sumter, and Shavonne Sampson. All four women attended the historically Black Seventh-day Adventist institution, Oakwood University (then Oakwood College).

Their self-titled debut album, Virtue, was released on April 29, 1997 by Verity Records. The album peaked at number 18 on Billboard's Christian Albums, and number 6 on Billboard's Top Gospel Albums. 

Virtue released several other albums throughout the late 1990s and early 2000s, including Get Ready (1999), Virtuosity (2001), Free (2003), and Testimony (2006). 

After Testimony, no new content was released by the group for over 9 years. This stretch ended in February of 2016 with the release of Fearless, their 7th studio album, which charted at number 3 on Billboard's Top Gospel Albums, their highest charting album to date.

Discography

Studio albums

Re-issued albums

Compilation albums

Singles

As a lead artist

Other appearances
Virtue performed on the Sisters in the Spirit tour with Shirley Caesar, Yolanda Adams and Mary Mary. They also performed on the Evolution II Tour 2003 with Byron Cage, Percy Bady Tonex, Lisa McClendon, and Corey Red & Precise.

They appeared on the album Bridges: Songs of Unity and Purpose in a duet with Clay Crosse and sang background for Darwin Hobbs on the song So Amazing from his album Vertical.

Music videos
 "Greatest Part of Me"
 "Follow Me"

Award history

References

Biography Interview
 

1997 debut albums
Virtue (musical group) albums

Footnotes

External links
Cross Rhythms Artist Profile – Virtue
Richard De La Font Agency, Inc - Artist Booking

American gospel musical groups
African-American girl groups
American girl groups
Musical groups established in 1994
Musical groups from New Orleans
Oakwood University alumni
Singers from Louisiana